Augustus Louis Ricardo (28 March 1843 – 19 April 1871) was an English cricketer. Ricardo was born in Chelsea, London.

Ricardo made a single first-class appearance for Hampshire in 1861 against the Marylebone Cricket Club. In the match he scored 5 runs and took 2 catches.

Ricardo died on 19 April 1871 in Cologne, German Empire.

References

External links
Augustus Ricardo at Cricinfo
Augustus Ricardo at CricketArchive

1843 births
1871 deaths
Cricketers from Chelsea, London
English cricketers
Hampshire cricketers